Wang Jiasheng (born January 1955) is a retired general (Shangjiang) of the People's Liberation Army (PLA) of China. He was Political Commissar of the PLA Rocket Force (previously known as the Second Artillery Force) from 2014 to 2020. He is now vice chairperson of the National People's Congress Supervisory and Judicial Affairs Committee.

Biography
Wang was born in January 1955 in Liaoyang, Liaoning. He studied at the National University of Defense Technology. He formerly served as a political officer in the PLA General Armaments Department (GAD), where he held posts including deputy director and director of the Political Department, and deputy political commissar. In December 2014, he was appointed political commissar of the PLA Second Artillery Force, replacing General Zhang Haiyang, who had retired.

Wang Jiasheng was made a member of the 18th Central Commission for Discipline Inspection in November 2012, and was promoted to the rank of lieutenant general in August 2013. On July 28, 2017, Wang was promoted to the rank of general.

In October 2017, he was elected as a member of the 19th Central Committee of the Communist Party of China.

References 

1955 births
Living people
People's Liberation Army generals from Liaoning
Members of the 19th Central Committee of the Chinese Communist Party
People from Liaoyang